Long-distance observation  is any visual observation, for sightseeing or photography, that targets all the objects, visible from the extremal distance with the possibility to see them closely. The long-distance observations can't cover:

Types of long distance observations 
With respect to the position of an observer and observed distant object, we can divide long-distance observations by the following types:
, where the primary criterion is an integration of an observer with the Earth's surface or the object, which is firmly integrated with the ground.

Ground-to-ground 
The ground-based long-distance observations cover the Earth's landscape and natural surface features (e.g. mountains, depressions, rock formations, vegetation), as well as manmade structures firmly associated with the Earth's surface (e.g. buildings, bridges, roads) that are located farther than the usual naked-eye distance from an observer. These objects may be natural or artificial.
The natural are:

The artificial are:

Ground to air 
The observer situated on the ground is able to observe some distant objects visible within the lower atmosphere, which can be i.e. distant plane passing just above the local horizon.

Aerial 
This type of long-distance observation refers to a situation, where an observer or photography device isn't integrated with the ground at the moment of observation. In this case the observation can be made from:

The aerial observations can also include other objects, which are already in the Earth's atmosphere.

Main aspects of long distance observations

Topographic

Object size and feature 
The objects, whose appearance is different from others are recognizable and detectable easier. It refers to these mountains, where some rock protrusions stand on the top. The same situation applies to the mountains more prominent than adjacent ones. Unlike mountains, industrial and infrastructure objects are usually much thinner, what makes them hard to notice and photography because of their angular width.

Object location 
The location of the observed object plays an important role, making it visible or not even from a small distance. The best visible are freestanding mountains or mountain ranges isolated from the mountain chain regardless of their relative altitude. Likewise separated mountains, industrial telecoms, and infrastructure objects are also visible from range because they are usually higher than the surrounding area. The telecommunications transmitters are often inherent elements of the mountains, making them easy distinguishable from others.

Topography along the line of sight 

Sometimes the prominent object can be hidden by another one standing somewhere in the middle between him and the observer. It happens usually inside the massive, often parallel mountain range, where a lot of peaks having a similar altitude block some distant mountain chains visible in the theoretical sense. An opposite situation takes place when the remote massive chains are separated by a vast plain, lowland, or large water body. The circumstances such that are the most favourable for seeing and capturing objects from the biggest possible distance, what the best example is the current world's record established between the Pyrenees and Alps in Europe. Both mountain ranges separated by lowland from each other must be high enough to be visible at long range like this. There are only a few places on Earth, where a similar or bigger result can be achieved.

Astronomical 

The most important astronomical factors determining the conditions of long-distance observations are:

Diurnal position of the Sun 

This is the most obvious astronomical factor, as the main source of light shapes the light scattering conditions on haze and visual object appearance.
When an object is located at a similar azimuth to the Sun, then its observation conditions are the worst. Because of the forward light scattering the haze concentrated nearby, the solar azimuth has a whitish appearance blocking the light reflected from an observed object's surface.   On the other hand, the Sun travels across the sky changing its position against the observed object. It also reflects changes the contrast of this object.
The solar azimuth always goes along with its angle above the horizon. When the Sun shines higher, less amount of light is scattered by the atmosphere toward the observer. Besides, the vista reflects more light, which results in more image-forming information (reflected photons from the vista) reaching the human eye. Otherworldly, the contrast detail and scene are enhanced.

The specific situation occurs at twilight when the Sun is below the horizon. This is the moment when the light scattering takes hold in the atmosphere. In the shaded part of the atmosphere, the secondary scattering takes place. As twilight progresses most of the atmospheric aerosols have an extinction coefficient decreasing in magnitude with increasing wavelength.

Presence of moonlight 

The moonlight plays an analogous role in the sunlight. However, this light is about 500k times fainter, than sunlight. As a result, the long-exposure photography is required to achieve a decent result of the observation. The full moon conditions are pretty much the same as considered for the daylight. This is only one significant natural light source beyond the Sun, which can seriously impact the scene's visibility. All other celestial bodies shine too weak for improving a distant scene visibility at night unless we consider an excellent dark-sky site combined with advanced long-exposure photography techniques. Besides, the moonlight doesn't appear all the time, as our natural satellite moves around the Earth. The illumination conditions shaped by the presence of the Moon change daily and repeat every lunar month, so its influence on the conditions of the long-distance observations at night is not always visible. Specifically unfavorable conditions occur when Moon shines lower above the horizon at twilight on the other side of the sky, where the Sunset or is about to rise. The forward scattering makes distant objects in an antisolar direction (inside the Earth's shadow) more difficult to spot. A combination of shaded Earth's atmosphere with relatively strong moonlight flattens the contrast between the sky and distant features. In practice the just-noticeable difference falls closer reducing the visual range towards this direction.

Seasonal variations of the sunrise and sunset azimuth 

Because of the annual variations of Earth's axial tilt the range of sunrise/sunset azimuth changes accordingly. Basically, its changes occur daily with exception of around-solstice periods when are barely noticeable. The quickest change of these azimuths falls roughly at the Equinox.  These seasonal changes of solar azimuth come along with shifts of the twilight glow azimuth either. By rough knowledge of the solar azimuth on the given day, we are usually able to capture a distant mountain emerging on its disk. It's beneficial especially during the hazy day when the captured object is not visible. It happens only rarely when the Sun is completely blocked by haze. This situation is mostly identified with misty conditions or smog. On a clear day, the solar disk visible at the horizon is much brighter than the surrounding sky, if the observed object is too small (i.e. phone transmitter) some filters or short exposures with narrow aperture can be essential. The yearly changes in the twilight azimuth determine the contrast enhancement between the certain part of our horizon and the sky is still illuminated by the Sun. Considering the northern hemisphere after sunset, the wintertime will be supportive for objects visible at the south-western and western horizon, whereas around the summer solstice the north-western horizon will be the best or even the northern at the latitudes, where nautical white nights occur.

Changes the range of azimuth at moonrise and moonset 

Analogically to the Sun, also Moon can rise or set beyond some distant objects. The major difference is in the brightness, which plays important role in terms of the thick Earth's atmosphere at the horizon line. When the atmosphere is not clear enough, moonlight can't break through it making Moon invisible yet before the set. Other important feature of the Moon is its long-term movement across the sky. Every 18,9 years, due to the lunar precession it comes into the major lunar standstill period, which is analogous to the solar solstice. Because the Orbit of the Moon has 5,15° inclination on average it translates into more various azimuths of the rise and set. During major lunar standstill the range of these azimuths is about 10,3° wider than solar ones as it reaches declination of ± 28,6°.  In practice, the moonrise or moonset can happen above objects located far south or north against the extremal azimuth range observed for the sunrise and sunset. Another thing, which plays a minor role in the facilitation of long-distance observations during the night time is the lunar twilight, which can be observed mostly on high-level clouds located ahead of the distant object.

Rare phenomena 

There is a group of celestial events, which can ease watching of the remote objects, but occur rarely or even extremely rarely. They are restricted with timing or space:
.
Noctilucent clouds – the event confined to the early summer period only, which because of its brightness can produce serious contrast difference between the distant object plunged in the darkness. It might happen just only under clear air mass conditions, which reduces the atmospheric extinction. A combination of noctilucent clouds appearance combined with unusually clear weather stresses the rarity of observation such as this.

Meteorological

Haze concentration 

The level of haze in the atmosphere, which primarily visible aftermath is the color of the sky. As research shows, the blueness of the sky can vary significantly depending on the density of aerosols. In the clearest conditions, which apply mainly for the "free atmosphere" above the inversion or planetary boundary layer the sky has the deep blue color, unlike inside hazy layer, where it acts like pale blue or even bluish-white. which varies between minimum 1 hour in the planetary boundary layer to about 1 week in the "free troposphere". It at some point defines the pace of visibility changes throughout the day following i.e. variations of humidity level. The relative humidity determines strongly the shape of aerosol particles, which eventually impacts their scattering properties. For instance, in a humid environment, the light scattering is more effective, because the aerosol particles have regular shapes. 
In arid conditions, the shape of aerosols is set by wind, which keeps them suspended for a long time.

Optical

Scattering of light 

Scattering of light plays important role in the visibility of distant features. Everything depends on three major factors, which are the presence of the major source of light, the degree of atmosphere clarity between the observer and distant feature, and the local pattern of the light scattering which depends on the light reflection from some objects or clouds.
Regardless of the degree of aerosol pollution in the atmosphere, we always list two major types of light scattering: 
- Forward scattering – typical for angular distance from the major source of light smaller than 90°, 
- Backward scattering – occurring at an angular distance higher than 90° from the major source of light.
In daylight conditions, the distant objects located at the antisolar direction are better visible, because the backward scattering doesn't reduce the visibility as strong as forward scattering.

Quite opposite situation occurs at twilight when twilight wedge becomes visible. At this moment the distant objects located in opposition to the solar azimuth are less visible due to vanishing contrast between the sky and ground, which loses its luminance quickly.
The effect of light scattering depends on the size of the particles, whereas the weakest is typical for near-Rayleigh conditions and the strongest for dese haze particles suspended in the atmosphere.
The substantial presence of aerosols in the Earth's atmosphere, especially within the Planetary boundary layer degrades the scene significantly.
This phenomenon tends to produce a distinctive gray hue, which affects atmospheric transparency. Light from the atmosphere and light reflected from an object is absorbed and scattered by aerosol particles leading to significant deterioration of visibility. 
This regularity applies to the clear day when the sky is free of clouds. It happens very often, that cloudiness occurs.
Clouds block the direct sunlight decreasing the light scattering at once. Thus the visual range is extended. The presence of clouds results in nonuniform solar illumination across the line of sight and inhomogeneous irradiance of the atmosphere at once. Thick clouds determine a perfect light diffusion, which is next radiated uniformly in all directions.
Considering the viewing line between the observer and watched the distant object, the illuminated aerosols directly by Sun scatter light more efficiently on the contrary to shaded aerosols. For the observers, the best situation occurs when the cloud cover stretches between their observation place and remote objects. However, the sky beyond these objects remains clear and bright. In turn, the contrast between the shaded distant feature and the bright sky beyond is the best, giving the highest chance to see this object. On the other hand, is fairly not possible to detect any details of object texture, as it remains completely shaded.

Landscape (object) features 

Every landscape feature has its own color, texture, form, and brightness.
The easiest feature to recognize from the distance is definitely the form. Mountains act as domes, beacons, buttes, or steep objects (triangles, protrusions, etc.). The second element, which can help with recognizing the distant object is its color and texture. In the case of mountains, especially not forested we can see their structure changes annually (summer-winter) by the presence of snow coverage. The color pattern of the landscape comes along with its brightness. Brightness makes the object more or less visible against the background. When the object's surface is brighter the light is reflected more effectively. It makes the reflected beam from this object stronger and more capable to reach the distant observer. The object illuminance influences on the scattering coefficient.
Additionally, we can take into account also the anthropogenic features of the object, which come down to the artificial light emission or reflection. Some skyscrapers can perfectly reflect the sunlight, producing glitters visible far away. On the other hand, if an object shines during the night, can be also visible much further than normally would be.

Light reflection at angle of incidence 

The important element here is the plane of incidence, which is the angle between a ray incident on the surface and a perpendicular line to the surface at the point of incidence. In a practical sense, the angle of incidence is always equal to the angle of reflection. When the light source is low above the horizon, the light beam can be almost parallel to the surface producing the grazing incidence. Concluding, the observer can see the reflected beam on the surface exactly at the plane of incidence. This plane of incidence determines the Sun glitter appearance, which exact pattern is determined by the precise location of the watcher.
It is composed of a multitude of suns stating as the little mirror, as a perfectly smooth surface can contain one glint. These glints are rather elliptical with an aspect ratio depends on the observer's altitude. Along with the low position of the bright source of light above the horizon comes the light reflectance value, which gradually increases as the source of light is lower above the horizon. Since latitude plays a role in the elevation of the Sun above the horizon, light penetration is always less at higher altitudes. The light reflection on the water body has a diffuse character, which means, that the angle of incidence does not appear as a straight line. Its border is usually very fuzzy with gentle reduction of single glitters when moving away from the major line. At the end of every line of light reflection, an observer can spot sudden darkening of the horizon called the Contrast triangle, which can push the visibility threshold a bit beyond. 
The light reflection at the angle of incidence applies also to various other sources of light not only direct but also scattered like by clouds or the sky. Therefore, they appear mirror-like on the smooth water. The role of scattered light reflected on the waterbody is significant especially during twilight at solar azimuth, which builds up a big contrast between the illuminated sky and shaded distant landscape feature. The analog phenomenon, but usually short-lived is the Glint. Glint is only the moment when the light is reflected, but it can be seen far away due to the light strength, even from about 200 km distance.

An analog phenomenon applies to clouds or haze. The common denominator here is just the difference between the medium on which surface the light is reflected or scattered. The describing effect might occur everywhere where the light reflection or scattering near the angle of incidence occurs at a denser medium. This denser medium can be the haze trapped inside the inversion layer, which remains somewhat the plain water surface. Because of the different physical states of the air body including haze, the way of light distribution varies significantly. The haze layer causes a much wider angle of reflection because the solar beam is cloven on small particles. The same situation applies to cloud deck marking the top of inversion layer. The cloud deck marks the area, where the dew point is reached, which ramps up the light reflection considerably. Observers located above the haze or cloud layer can effectively see the 3 major levels of brightness: from the inversion layer (clouds or haze), from the object, and also from the illuminated atmosphere beyond.
These circumstances can be altered by snow coverage, which changes significantly the albedo of the distant feature surface unless it's forested. The high albedo of the distant object being just underneath the Sun flattens the contrast, making it less visible for an observer. On the other hand, the mountains located at the solar azimuth in the wintertime, when the Sun is low, usually shade themselves. Therefore, the albedo plays a minor role here.

Geometric

Essential tools 

Planning long-distance observations often requires studying the destination area. The observer obviously can see distant objects on-site, although without decent tools is unable to identify them properly. The traditional tourist map might be not enough for this purpose, especially because of their primary objective. We have obviously a wide choice of maps for hiking tourism, which contains a reach set of names of peaks, passes and valleys  and detailed representation of the relief, which should result in a good orientation in hard terrain. A vast majority of these maps is large-scaled, which is impractical for identifying remote objects, as their locations are far outside of the tourist map. For proper recognition of these far-off silhouettes, an observer needs at least a few maps such as this. Moreover, the process of manual object identification is usually time-consuming and impossible on-site without advanced topography knowledge acquired before.

With the growth of the Internet, this method is not used anymore or used occasionally for smaller areas or for mountain guide course purposes. In exchange for it, an observer can do a relevant investigation yet at home, before setting off on the destination site by using at least a few tools available on the market.

Aerial records

Ground-to-ground world records 
Currently, World records of the most distant landscape photography can be divided by:

Other lines of sight:

The longest line of sight in the British Isles is from Snowdon to Merrick – 232 km.
This was photographed by Kris Williams in 2015.

The longest line of sight that has been photographed within the USA is Denali from Mount Sanford at 370 km distance.

Other long-distance photographs include:
 Puig D'en Galileu in Serra de Tramuntana to Pic de Saloria in Pyrenees – 324  km – Marcos Molina.
 Wellington, New Zealand to Mount Taranaki – 330  km – Naked eye line of sight.

Ground-to-ground the longest distance observations by country

References

External links 
 Longest line of sight in the UK – discussion
 The furthest you can see on a clear day – discussion
 Longest lines of sight photographed
 What is the maximum range I can get?

Landscape photography